Welcome to the Real World is the debut studio album by the Australian rock band, Sick Puppies.  The album was released only in Australia on 3 September 2001 as an enhanced CD with the "Every Day" music video included. The album's 3,000 copies that were pressed were only sold in Australia, making it very valuable – and only available – on the second-hand market. The album was released with the "Every Day" single on some pressings. This is the band's only studio album to feature Chris Mileski on drums.

Pre-release
The band entered the Triple J Unearthed band competition in 2000 with a demo of their song, "Nothing Really Matters", and went on to co-win the Sydney-region along with Blue and Ariels.Spans.Earth. which led to a management deal with Paul Stepanek Management. This deal enabled the band to release the full album of Welcome to the Real World. Along with "Nothing Really Matters", two other singles were released before the full album was made available; "Every Day" and "Rock Kids".

Music videos
Two music videos were produced for this album, the first being for the demo version of "Nothing Really Matters", which was released in 2000, and the other being for "Every Day", which was released with the album.

The music video for "Nothing Really Matters" is composed of live footage from 2000 of the band playing in Sydney. The music video for "Every Day", on the other hand, shows the band playing in an old hallway, with cuts to the band members dressed in different occupational attires such as a clown, an astronaut, a boxer and a policeman, with other shots of them dressed in straight jackets.

US release
Welcome to the Real World was released in the United States in early 2016. With no official word from the band, the record was added to the Apple Music iTunes store. Single releases for Rock Kids and Every Day also appeared for purchase. This came after the departure of vocalist/guitarist Shimon Moore and on the heel of their record, Fury, with new vocalist Bryan Scott.

Track listing

Outtakes
The album was initially supposed to feature a humorous cover version of Destiny's Child's hit single "Say My Name", characterised by turntable samples and heavy Flea-esque bass lines. The song "Brain Stew" by Green Day is used as background music. The cover contains additional lyrics with coarse language; for example, the chorus invariably ends with "You're acting kinda shady, ain't callin' me baby/So what the fuck?". The song, however, was not included due to the threat of a lawsuit by Destiny's Child's record label. The cover was later leaked on the internet and is regularly played at Sick Puppies' concerts.

Personnel
 Shim Moore – lead vocals, guitar
 Emma Anzai – Bass guitar, backing vocals
 Chris Mileski – drums

References

Sick Puppies albums
2001 debut albums
Virgin Records albums